The  is a rapid transit electric multiple unit (EMU) train type operated by Osaka Municipal Subway in Japan since 1990.

Overview 
Seventeen eight-car sets were built to replace the older 60 series sets on the Sakaisuji Line. 

The first 12 sets (96 cars) were built in 1990 while an expansion of 40 cars (5 sets) were introduced between 2002 and 2004.

Formations 
The Sakaisuji Line fleet consists of 17 eight-car trainsets formed as follows, with car 1 at the Tenchagaya end.

 The "Ma1" and "Ma2" cars are each fitted with two scissors-type pantographs.

Interior 
Passenger accommodation consists of longitudinal seating throughout.

History 
The trains started to undergo refurbishment in 2012. Set 66605 was the first train to be refurbished. It returned to service in February 2013. Works included a new paint scheme, various installations of LED displays and lights, and the installation of a front skirt.

References

External links 

 Osaka Municipal Transport Bureau website

Electric multiple units of Japan
66 series
66 series
Kawasaki multiple units
Kinki Sharyo multiple units
Train-related introductions in 1990
1500 V DC multiple units of Japan